Daria Kasatkina and Elena Vesnina were the defending champions, but chose not to participate together this year. Vesnina played with Ekaterina Makarova, but lost to Daria Gavrilova and Kasatkina in the first round.

Andrea Hlaváčková and Lucie Hradecká won the title, defeating Gavrilova and Kasatkina in the final, 4–6, 6–0, [10–7].

Seeds

Draw

References
 Draw

2016 Women's Doubles
Kremlin Cup – Doubles